Laraine Newman (born March 2, 1952) is an American actress, comedian, and writer. Newman was part of the original cast of NBC's long-running sketch comedy series Saturday Night Live from its inception in 1975 until her departure in 1980. She took an interest at improv in high school. After graduating, she studied mime with Marcel Marceau for a year in Paris. She then moved to Los Angeles and became a founding member of comedy improvisational group The Groundlings.

She was first hired by Lorne Michaels for a Lily Tomlin TV special in 1974. The next year Newman became one of the original cast members of Saturday Night Live, working there from 1975 to 1980 and creating characters like Connie Conehead, proto-Valley girl Sherry, and Christie Christina. In 2017, she and the rest of the original cast members of SNL were among the honorees of Television Academy's Hall of Fame.

She has appeared in movies like Stardust Memories, Problem Child 2, Coneheads, and The Flintstones. She is also a voice actor with appearances in both TV shows and movies, including many Pixar films like Finding Nemo, WALL-E, Up, and Inside Out. In 2021 her memoir May You Live in Interesting Times was released on Audible.

She is the younger sister of writer and musician Tracy Newman and the mother of actress and comedian Hannah Einbinder.

Personal life
Newman was born on March 2, 1952, in Los Angeles, California, the granddaughter of a cattle rancher from Arizona. Her family is Jewish. She is the youngest of four children and has a twin brother Paul. Her sister, Tracy Newman, is an Emmy Award-winning television writer. Newman attended Beverly Hills High School in Beverly Hills, California and graduated from there in 1970. Newman married actor-writer-director Chad Einbinder in 1991; their marriage ended after 25 years. Newman and Einbinder have two children, Spike and actor and comedian Hannah.

The song "Never Let Her Slip Away," written and recorded by Andrew Gold, was about Newman. The two were a couple at the time. The song hit #5 on the UK charts in 1978.

Early life and career
Newman took her first improvisational theatre classes when she was 15. At the age of 17, Newman lost her virginity to American singer and guitarist Johnny Winter. After finishing high school she auditioned for four acting schools in England including the Royal Academy of Dramatic Art, London Academy of Music and Dramatic Art and Bristol Old Vic. She was not accepted after the second round of auditions for all four schools, so she went to Paris to study mime with Marcel Marceau for a year.

By the age of 19, Newman returned to the United States, and moved to Los Angeles, where she did a brief stint at a secretarial school. Committed to continue performing, she was a founding member of the pioneering comedy improvisational group The Groundlings. At the same time, Newman was working for a booking agent who worked with rock bands, typing up contracts.

Newman cites Eve Arden, Madeline Kahn and Richard Pryor as her first major influences, saying "They led me into my life of comedy, they led me into understanding 'The Art of Play.'"

Saturday Night Live
In 1974, Lorne Michaels hired 22-year-old Newman for a Lily Tomlin special, impressed with her work as founder and original member of The Groundlings. A year later, she became an original cast member on NBC's Saturday Night Live, appearing on the show from its inception in 1975 through 1980.

During her five years on SNL she became a close friend of co-star Gilda Radner, although there was also a degree of rivalry between them. The instant success of SNL propelled her to stardom very quickly. Newman recalled being stopped in the street in New York City by John Lennon and Yoko Ono, who introduced themselves to her.

Newman admits that she was "never a good improviser," but when in character, like an angry Jewish poet, a flight attendant, an eccentric chef, or a British groupie, she was "free."

Commenting on her early experiences during Saturday Night Live she said: "When I first performed (my characters) and the audience responded, I felt like crying, I mean the idea that what I saw—what other people saw—(meant) I wasn't so alone in my perspective. I hope this doesn't sound too overblown, but it really did feel like a Communion."

However, by her own account, Newman was unhappy for much of her time with the show. She disliked living in New York, and during her years on SNL, Newman had developed serious eating disorders, as well as heroin addiction. She spent so much time in her dressing room playing solitaire that for Christmas 1979, castmate Radner gave her a deck of playing cards with a picture of Newman on the face of each card.

Newman was photographed as a vampire by Francesco Scavullo for the July 1978 issue of High Times. The accompanying interview introduced Newman as the "Skinny spaced-out sex symbol of Saturday Night Live."

Recurring characters on Saturday Night Live
Newman is best known for her roles as Connie Conehead, proto-Valley girl Sherry, and Christie Christina, the ditzy co-host of E. Buzz Miller (Dan Aykroyd)'s public-access television cable TV show. Using her own name, Newman also played a TV news reporter for Weekend Update when the segment was hosted by Chevy Chase (1975-1976) and Jane Curtin (1976-1980). Newman generally decided not to repeat her characters, and so she has far fewer signature characters remembered as well as those played by some of her other fellow cast members. Still, Newman created many important SNL characters and helped, as part of the whole ensemble cast, to shape the early years of SNL.

Newman states when asked about her favorite Saturday Night Live character: "My favorite character that I created at Saturday Night Live, which, I think, only pleased me and no one else, was Lina Wertmüller (based on the actual Lina Wertmüller)."

Later life and career
Newman's post-SNL film career has been in both leading and supporting roles, as well as a voice artist in television and features.

In her memoirs Newman recounted dating Dan Aykroyd, Warren Zevon, Peter Cook, Phil Hartman, and P.J. O'Rourke. She was also in a relationship with Mark Mothersbaugh of the new wave band Devo years after the band did a guest spot in the fourth season of SNL. Newman and Mothersbaugh were a couple for years, during which time Newman played Donut Rooter in the band's We're All Devo VHS release (1984). In her memoirs, Newman claimed she was celibate for four years after the end of her relationship with Mothersbaugh.

1970s
Prior to leaving SNL, Newman appeared in American Hot Wax (1978) and did a cameo in Mr. Mike's Mondo Video (1979).

1980s
Newman continued to appear in film and television productions during the 1980s. Among these were Wholly Moses, Voltar The Invincible and Invaders from Mars. She also had a small role in Woody Allen's Stardust Memories (1980). In 1986 she starred in the syndicated B-movie comedy series, The Canned Film Festival, playing the lead role as Laraine the usherette.  Additionally, she made appearances on such programs as Laverne & Shirley, E.T. and Friends (1983), in which she reprised her role as Connie Conehead, Steve Martin's Best Show Ever (1981), St. Elsewhere, and Amazing Stories. Newman auditioned for the role of Masha in Martin Scorsese's The King of Comedy (1983); the role was played in the film by Sandra Bernhard. By her own admission, Newman's career during this period languished as she struggled with depression and chemical dependency issues. Newman became sober in 1987, after 21 years of drug use.

Newman celebrated her 36th birthday in March 1988 with a party in Los Angeles that was the last time Gilda Radner was with her original SNL co-stars. According to Bill Murray, when he heard Radner was about to leave the party, he and Dan Aykroyd carried her around the Los Angeles house where the party was held so that she could say goodbye to everyone. Radner died on May 20, 1989.

1990s
Newman played the antagonist in Problem Child 2 (1991) and also appeared in 1993's Coneheads (in which Michelle Burke played Connie Conehead, the character Newman originated on SNL, while Newman appeared in a minor role as Connie's aunt Laarta). Newman further appeared in episodes of Friends, 3rd Rock from the Sun, 7th Heaven, and in the 1994 film The Flintstones. Additionally, during this time, she started to focus on voice acting, working on The Tick, Histeria!, CatDog, and Rugrats (in "All Growed Up", an episode which would form the basis of the spinoff All Grown Up!, for which she also provided voice work).

2000s
In the 2000s Newman lent her voice to many characters in animated movies and television productions. Among these were Danny Phantom, As Told By Ginger, Avatar: The Last Airbender, Metalocalypse and Jimmy Neutron: Boy Genius. She further provided voice work for WALL-E, Battle for Terra, Ponyo, Jungle Junction, Cars, Up!, Finding Nemo, Monsters, Inc., Barnyard, Cloudy with a Chance of Meatballs, Happily N'Ever After, and Horton Hears a Who!.

Newman also appeared in episodes of Entourage, Brothers & Sisters, According to Jim, and Curb Your Enthusiasm.

2010s

She continues to provide her voice for movies like Dr. Seuss' The Lorax and Wreck-It Ralph. Newman made guest voice appearances in SpongeBob SquarePants (as Plankton's grandmother), Doc McStuffins, and Harvey Street Kids . She also voices Queen Jipjorrulac, the mother of Mark Chang, in The Fairly OddParents.

She voiced the Wicked Witch of the West in Tom and Jerry and the Wizard of Oz, an animated direct-to-DVD film set during the events of the original 1939 film.

On July 9, 2014, Newman appeared on Ken Reid's TV Guidance Counselor podcast.

In 2017, Newman (along with the other original cast members of Saturday Night Live) was inducted into the Television Academy's 24th Hall of Fame ceremony.

Writing
Newman also works as a writer and editor. She is a contributing editor for the online magazine One For The Table, and she is an occasional contributor to the Huffington Post. She has contributed articles for the Los Angeles Times, The Believer, and McSweeney's. She wrote the foreword to the book version of the UCB Production Worst Laid Plans. In March 2021, she published her audio memoir May You Live in Interesting Times on Audible.

Filmography

Live-action

Film

Television

Voice roles

Film

Television

Video games

Accolades
Newman has been nominated for awards numerous times, most notably for an Emmy in 1979 as a cast member of Saturday Night Live.

References

External links
 
 
 
 
 Writings at One for the Table
 

20th-century American actresses
21st-century American actresses
Actresses from California
Actresses from Los Angeles
American film actresses
American television actresses
American sketch comedians
American stage actresses
American video game actresses
American voice actresses
American women comedians
Beverly Hills High School alumni
Comedians from Los Angeles County
Jewish American actresses
Jewish American comedians
Living people
20th-century American comedians
21st-century American comedians
Jewish American female comedians
21st-century American Jews
1952 births